Jordi Cervelló i Garriga (18 October 1935 – 2 September 2022) was a Catalan composer.

Cervelló was born in Barcelona on 18 October 1935. He studied violin with Joan Massià and composition with Josep M. Roma. Later he went to Rome, Milan, Siena and Salzburg. He has done important work as a professor at Badalona Conservatory from 1982 to 1996 and as author of the Treatise on the Fundamental Principles of Violin Technique. He was a critic at El País newspaper. In 2006 he received the Cross of St. George and in 2010 the National Music Prize from the Catalan Government. He died from pneumonia on 2 September 2022, at the age of 86.

The personal papers of Jordi Cervelló are preserved in the Biblioteca de Catalunya.

Bibliography 
Francesc Taverna-Bech and Álvaro García Estefanía, Jordi Cervelló, Sociedad General de Autores de España, Madrid, 1994.

References

External links
 Official blog of Jordi Cervelló
 
 

1935 births
2022 deaths
Composers from Catalonia
Musicians from Catalonia
People from Barcelona
Spanish male composers
Spanish classical musicians